The first season of Drag Race Thailand is a Thai reality competition show based on the American version with RuPaul. Art Arya and Pangina Heals are the judges of the show. The season premiered on 15 February 2018 and ended on 5 April 2018.
The winner of this season was Natalia Pliacam, with Année Maywong and Dearis Doll as the runners-up. B Ella, who finished fourth, was voted Miss Congeniality.

Contestants 

(Ages, names, and cities stated are at time of filming.)

Contestant progress

Lip syncs

 The contestant was eliminated after their first time in the bottom.
 The contestant was eliminated after their second time in the bottom.

Guest judges

Madame Mod, Thai drag queen
Madeaw, stylist
Pa-Tue, fashion designer
Marsha Vadhanapanich, actress, model and singer
Jai Sira, Thai drag queen
Mae Baan Mee Nuad, Thai drag queen
Prapakas Angsulin, fashion designer
Cris Horwang, actress and model
Ananda Everingham, actor
Sinjai Plengpanich, actress, model and singer
Pattriya Na Nakorn, author, socialite and Director at Gucci
Metinee Kingpayom, actress, model and producer
Polpat Asavaprapha, fashion designer
Araya A. Hargate, actress, model and TV host
, actress
Pavarisa Chumvigrant, VP of Marketing "Line Mobile", DTAC TriNet Co., Ltd.
Chom, Thai drag queen
Ploy Chermarn, actress and model
Utt Uttsada, actor and model

Special guests
Guests who appeared in episodes, but did not judge on the main stage.

Episode 4
Ajirapha "Sabina" Meisinger, actress and model
Natthaya "Grace" Boonchompaisarn, model
RuPaul, American drag queen and RuPaul's Drag Race host

Episode 7
, DJ
Teerasak Promngoen, actor

Episode 7
Amadiva, contestant on season one
Dearis Doll, contestant on season one
JAJA, contestant on season one
Meannie Minaj, contestant on season one
Morrigan, contestant on season one
Petchra, contestant on season one

Episodes

Reception
The season 1 of Drag Race Thailand was met with a successful rating in Thai television. It was later announced that the first season will premiere in the United States in May 2018. The first season also made stirs in the Asian LGBT community, the most prominent of which is a campaign to establish a RuPaul's Drag Race version as well in the Philippines and Taiwan, two of the most LGBT-accepting nations in all of Asia.

References
 

2018 Thai television seasons
Drag Race Thailand seasons
2018 in LGBT history